The Municipality of Cerklje na Gorenjskem is a municipality in Slovenia. The seat of the municipality is the town of Cerklje na Gorenjskem.

Settlements
In addition to the municipal seat of Cerklje na Gorenjskem, the municipality also includes the following settlements:

 Adergas
 Ambrož pod Krvavcem
 Apno
 Cerkljanska Dobrava
 Češnjevek
 Dvorje
 Glinje
 Grad
 Lahovče
 Poženik
 Praprotna Polica
 Pšata
 Pšenična Polica
 Ravne
 Šenturška Gora
 Sidraž
 Šmartno
 Spodnji Brnik
 Štefanja Gora
 Stiška Vas
 Sveti Lenart
 Trata pri Velesovem
 Vašca
 Velesovo
 Viševca
 Vopovlje
 Vrhovje
 Zalog pri Cerkljah
 Zgornji Brnik

Airport
Ljubljana Airport is located near the village of Zgornji Brnik in the  municipality.

See also

Krvavec Ski Resort

References

External links
 
 Municipality of Cerklje na Gorenjskem on Geopedia
 Municipality of Cerklje na Gorenjskem official page 

Cerklje na Gorenjskem
1994 establishments in Slovenia